The Lesser Polish dialect is a cluster of regional varieties of the Polish language around the Lesser Poland historical region. The exact area is difficult to delineate due to the expansion of its features and the existence of transitional subdialects.

Commonly recognized subdialects of the Lesser Polish dialect include Podhale, Lwów,  and some others.

Lesser Polish has a longstanding liturgical tradition, especially compared to the other polish dialectal regions. There are many books and poems written in the Kraków and Podhale dialects. 

The common traits of the Lesser Polish dialect include:
mazurzenie
 regressive voicing of obstruents, including across word boundaries; e.g.: kot leci [kɔd ˈlɛt͡ɕi] (standard Polish: [kɔt ˈlɛt͡ɕi])
 differentiated nasalisation (or lack thereof) of /ɔ̃/ and /ɛ̃/ in different parts of the area
 merger of stop+fricative consonant clusters into affricates; e.g.: trzysta [ˈt͡ʂɨsta] (standard Polish: [ˈtʂɨsta] or [ˈt͡ʂʂɨsta])
 frequent usage of initial syllable stress, also oxytonic stress in vocative case (as opposed to paroxytonic stress common in other varieties of Polish)
 frequent usage of grammatical particle "że" in imperative mood ("weźże" vs. "weź" – take)

References

Polish dialects
Lesser Poland